Déo Cesário Botelho or Déo Rian (born February 26, 1944 in Rio de Janeiro) is a Brazilian musician, composer and choro bandolinist.

He is a student of Jacob do Bandolim.  In 1970 after Jacob's death, he took over his teacher's role as band leader and mandolinist in the choro orchestra Época de Ouro.

See also 
 Choro

References

External links 
 Instituto Cultural Cravo Albin 

1944 births
Brazilian mandolinists
Choro musicians
Brazilian composers
Living people